Brown dwarfs (also called failed stars) are substellar objects that are not massive enough to sustain nuclear fusion of ordinary hydrogen (1H) into helium in their cores, unlike a main-sequence star. Instead, they have a mass between the most massive gas giant planets and the least massive stars, approximately 13 to 80 times that of Jupiter. However, they can fuse deuterium (2H) and the most massive ones (> ) can fuse lithium (7Li).

Astronomers classify self-luminous objects by spectral class, a distinction intimately tied to the surface temperature, and brown dwarfs occupy types M, L, T, and Y. As brown dwarfs do not undergo stable hydrogen fusion, they cool down over time, progressively passing through later spectral types as they age.

Despite their name, to the naked eye, brown dwarfs would appear in different colors depending on their temperature. The warmest ones are possibly orange or red, while cooler brown dwarfs would likely appear magenta or black to the human eye. Brown dwarfs may be fully convective, with no layers or chemical differentiation by depth.

Though their existence was initially theorized in the 1960s, it was not until the mid-1990s that the first unambiguous brown dwarfs were discovered. As brown dwarfs have relatively low surface temperatures, they are not very bright at visible wavelengths, emitting most of their light in the infrared. However, with the advent of more capable infrared detecting devices, thousands of brown dwarfs have been identified. Luhman 16 is the third closest system to the Sun after Alpha Centauri and Barnard's Star.

History

Early theorizing

The objects now called "brown dwarfs" were theorized by Shiv S. Kumar in the 1960s to exist and were originally called black dwarfs, a classification for dark substellar objects floating freely in space that were not massive enough to sustain hydrogen fusion. However, (a) the term black dwarf was already in use to refer to a cold white dwarf; (b) red dwarfs fuse hydrogen; and (c) these objects may be luminous at visible wavelengths early in their lives. Because of this, alternative names for these objects were proposed, including planetar and substar. In 1975, Jill Tarter suggested the term "brown dwarf", using "brown" as an approximate color.

The term "black dwarf" still refers to a white dwarf that has cooled to the point that it no longer emits significant amounts of light. However, the time required for even the lowest-mass white dwarf to cool to this temperature is calculated to be longer than the current age of the universe; hence such objects are expected to not yet exist.

Early theories concerning the nature of the lowest-mass stars and the hydrogen-burning limit suggested that a population I object with a mass less than 0.07 solar masses or a population II object less than  would never go through normal stellar evolution and would become a completely degenerate star. The first self-consistent calculation of the hydrogen-burning minimum mass confirmed a value between 0.07 and 0.08 solar masses for population I objects.

Deuterium fusion
However, such objects were hard to find because they emit almost no visible light. Their strongest emissions are in the infrared (IR) spectrum, and ground-based IR detectors were too imprecise at that time to readily identify any brown dwarfs.

Since then, numerous searches by various methods have sought these objects. These methods included multi-color imaging surveys around field stars, imaging surveys for faint companions of main-sequence dwarfs and white dwarfs, surveys of young star clusters, and radial velocity monitoring for close companions.

GD 165B and class L
For many years, efforts to discover brown dwarfs were fruitless. In 1988, however, a faint companion to the white dwarf star GD 165 was found in an infrared search of white dwarfs. The spectrum of the companion GD 165B was very red and enigmatic, showing none of the features expected of a low-mass red dwarf. It became clear that GD 165B would need to be classified as a much cooler object than the latest M dwarfs then known. GD 165B remained unique for almost a decade until the advent of the Two Micron All-Sky Survey (2MASS) which discovered many objects with similar colors and spectral features.

Today, GD 165B is recognized as the prototype of a class of objects now called "L dwarfs".

Although the discovery of the coolest dwarf was highly significant at the time, it was debated whether GD 165B would be classified as a brown dwarf or simply a very-low-mass star, because observationally it is very difficult to distinguish between the two.

Soon after the discovery of GD 165B, other brown-dwarf candidates were reported. Most failed to live up to their candidacy, however, because the absence of lithium showed them to be stellar objects. True stars burn their lithium within a little over 100 Myr, whereas brown dwarfs (which can, confusingly, have temperatures and luminosities similar to true stars) will not. Hence, the detection of lithium in the atmosphere of an object older than 100 Myr ensures that it is a brown dwarf.

Gliese 229B and class T
The first class "T" brown dwarf was discovered in 1994 by Caltech astronomers Shrinivas Kulkarni, Tadashi Nakajima, Keith Matthews and Rebecca Oppenheimer, and Johns Hopkins scientists Samuel T. Durrance and David Golimowski. It was confirmed in 1995 as a substellar companion to Gliese 229. Gliese 229b is one of the first two instances of clear evidence for a brown dwarf, along with Teide 1. Confirmed in 1995, both were identified by the presence of the 670.8 nm lithium line. The latter was found to have a temperature and luminosity well below the stellar range.

Its near-infrared spectrum clearly exhibited a methane absorption band at 2 micrometres, a feature that had previously only been observed in the atmospheres of giant planets and that of Saturn's moon Titan. Methane absorption is not expected at any temperature of a main-sequence star. This discovery helped to establish yet another spectral class even cooler than L dwarfs, known as "T dwarfs", for which Gliese 229B is the prototype.

Teide 1 and class M
The first confirmed class "M" brown dwarf was discovered by Spanish astrophysicists Rafael Rebolo (head of team), María Rosa Zapatero-Osorio, and Eduardo L. Martín in 1994. This object, found in the Pleiades open cluster, received the name Teide 1. The discovery article was submitted to Nature in May 1995, and published on 14 September 1995. Nature highlighted "Brown dwarfs discovered, official" in the front page of that issue.

Teide 1 was discovered in images collected by the IAC team on 6 January 1994 using the 80 cm telescope (IAC 80) at Teide Observatory and its spectrum was first recorded in December 1994 using the 4.2 m William Herschel Telescope at Roque de los Muchachos Observatory (La Palma). The distance, chemical composition, and age of Teide 1 could be established because of its membership in the young Pleiades star cluster. The object became a reference in subsequent young brown dwarf related works.

In theory, a brown dwarf below  is unable to burn lithium by thermonuclear fusion at any time during its evolution. This fact is one of the lithium test principles used to judge the substellar nature of low-luminosity and low-surface-temperature astronomical bodies.

High-quality spectral data acquired by the Keck 1 telescope in November 1995 showed that Teide 1 still had the initial lithium abundance of the original molecular cloud from which Pleiades stars formed, proving the lack of thermonuclear fusion in its core. These observations confirmed that Teide 1 is a brown dwarf, as well as the efficiency of the spectroscopic lithium test.

For some time, Teide 1 was the smallest-known object outside the Solar System that had been identified by direct observation. Since then, over 1,800 brown dwarfs have been identified, even some very close to Earth like Epsilon Indi Ba and Bb, a pair of brown dwarfs gravitationally bound to a Sun-like star 12 light-years from the Sun, and Luhman 16, a binary system of brown dwarfs at 6.5 light-years from the Sun.

Theory

The standard mechanism for star birth is through the gravitational collapse of a cold interstellar cloud of gas and dust. As the cloud contracts it heats due to the Kelvin–Helmholtz mechanism. Early in the process the contracting gas quickly radiates away much of the energy, allowing the collapse to continue. Eventually, the central region becomes sufficiently dense to trap radiation. Consequently, the central temperature and density of the collapsed cloud increases dramatically with time, slowing the contraction, until the conditions are hot and dense enough for thermonuclear reactions to occur in the core of the protostar. For most stars, gas and radiation pressure generated by the thermonuclear fusion reactions within the core of the star will support it against any further gravitational contraction. Hydrostatic equilibrium is reached and the star will spend most of its lifetime fusing hydrogen into helium as a main-sequence star.

Gravitational contraction does not heat the small protostar very effectively, and before the temperature in the core can increase enough to trigger fusion, the density reaches the point where electrons become closely packed enough to create quantum electron degeneracy pressure. According to the brown dwarf interior models, typical conditions in the core for density, temperature and pressure are expected to be the following:

This means that the protostar is not massive enough and not dense enough to ever reach the conditions needed to sustain hydrogen fusion. The infalling matter is prevented, by electron degeneracy pressure, from reaching the densities and pressures needed.

Further gravitational contraction is prevented and the result is a "failed star", or brown dwarf that simply cools off by radiating away its internal thermal energy. Note that, in principle, it is possible for a brown dwarf to slowly accrete mass above the hydrogen burning limit without initiating hydrogen fusion. This could happen via mass transfer in a binary brown dwarf system.

High-mass brown dwarfs versus low-mass stars
Lithium is generally present in brown dwarfs and not in low-mass stars. Stars, which reach the high temperature necessary for fusing hydrogen, rapidly deplete their lithium. Fusion of lithium-7 and a proton occurs producing two helium-4 nuclei. The temperature necessary for this reaction is just below that necessary for hydrogen fusion. Convection in low-mass stars ensures that lithium in the whole volume of the star is eventually depleted. Therefore, the presence of the lithium spectral line in a candidate brown dwarf is a strong indicator that it is indeed a substellar object.

The lithium test
The use of lithium to distinguish candidate brown dwarfs from low-mass stars is commonly referred to as the lithium test, and was pioneered by Rafael Rebolo, Eduardo Martín and Antonio Magazzu. However, lithium is also seen in very young stars, which have not yet had enough time to burn it all.

Heavier stars, like the Sun, can also retain lithium in their outer layers, which never get hot enough to fuse lithium, and whose convective layer does not mix with the core where the lithium would be rapidly depleted. Those larger stars are easily distinguishable from brown dwarfs by their size and luminosity.

Conversely, brown dwarfs at the high end of their mass range can be hot enough to deplete their lithium when they are young. Dwarfs of mass greater than  can burn their lithium by the time they are half a billion years old, thus the lithium test is not perfect.

Atmospheric methane
Unlike stars, older brown dwarfs are sometimes cool enough that, over very long periods of time, their atmospheres can gather observable quantities of methane which cannot form in hotter objects. Dwarfs confirmed in this fashion include Gliese 229B.

Iron rain
Main-sequence stars cool, but eventually reach a minimum bolometric luminosity that they can sustain through steady fusion. This varies from star to star, but is generally at least 0.01% that of the Sun. Brown dwarfs cool and darken steadily over their lifetimes; sufficiently old brown dwarfs will be too faint to be detectable.

Iron rain as part of atmospheric convection processes is possible only in brown dwarfs, and not in small stars. The spectroscopy research into iron rain is still ongoing, but not all brown dwarfs will always have this atmospheric anomaly. In 2013, a heterogeneous iron-containing atmosphere was imaged around the B component in the nearby Luhman 16 system.

Low-mass brown dwarfs versus high-mass planets

Like stars, brown dwarfs form independently, but, unlike stars, lack sufficient mass to "ignite". Like all stars, they can occur singly or in close proximity to other stars. Some orbit stars and can, like planets, have eccentric orbits.

Size and fuel-burning ambiguities
Brown dwarfs are all roughly the same radius as Jupiter. At the high end of their mass range, the volume of a brown dwarf is governed primarily by electron-degeneracy pressure, as it is in white dwarfs; at the low end of the range, their volume is governed primarily by Coulomb pressure, as it is in planets. The net result is that the radii of brown dwarfs vary by only 10–15% over the range of possible masses. Moreover, the mass–radius relationship shows no change from about one Saturn mass to the onset of hydrogen burning, suggesting that from this perspective brown dwarfs are simply high-mass Jovian planets. This can make distinguishing them from planets difficult.

In addition, many brown dwarfs undergo no fusion; even those at the high end of the mass range (over ) cool quickly enough that after 10 million years they no longer undergo fusion.

Heat spectrum
X-ray and infrared spectra are telltale signs of brown dwarfs. Some emit X-rays; and all "warm" dwarfs continue to glow tellingly in the red and infrared spectra until they cool to planet-like temperatures (under 1,000 K).

Gas giants have some of the characteristics of brown dwarfs. Like the Sun, Jupiter and Saturn are both made primarily of hydrogen and helium. Saturn is nearly as large as Jupiter, despite having only 30% the mass. Three of the giant planets in the Solar System (Jupiter, Saturn, and Neptune) emit much more (up to about twice) heat than they receive from the Sun. All four giant planets have their own "planetary" systems, in the form of extensive moon systems.

Current IAU standard
Currently, the International Astronomical Union considers an object above  (the limiting mass for thermonuclear fusion of deuterium) to be a brown dwarf, whereas an object under that mass (and orbiting a star or stellar remnant) is considered a planet. The minimum mass required to trigger sustained hydrogen-burning (about ) forms the upper limit of the definition.

It is also debated whether brown dwarfs would be better defined by their formation process rather than by theoretical mass limits based on nuclear fusion reactions. Under this interpretation brown dwarfs are those objects that represent the lowest-mass products of the star formation process, while planets are objects formed in an accretion disk surrounding a star. The coolest free-floating objects discovered such as WISE 0855, as well as the lowest-mass young objects known like PSO J318.5−22, are thought to have masses below , and as a result are sometimes referred to as planetary mass objects due to the ambiguity of whether they should be regarded as rogue planets or brown dwarfs. There are planetary mass objects known to orbit brown dwarfs, such as 2M1207b, MOA-2007-BLG-192Lb, 2MASS J044144b and Oph 98 B.

The 13 Jupiter-mass cutoff is a rule of thumb rather than something of precise physical significance. Larger objects will burn most of their deuterium and smaller ones will burn only a little, and the 13 Jupiter-mass value is somewhere in between. The amount of deuterium burnt also depends to some extent on the composition of the object, specifically on the amount of helium and deuterium present and on the fraction of heavier elements, which determines the atmospheric opacity and thus the radiative cooling rate.

As of 2016, this limit was increased to 60 Jupiter masses, based on a study of mass–density relationships.

The Exoplanet Data Explorer includes objects up to 24 Jupiter masses with the advisory: "The 13 Jupiter-mass distinction by the IAU Working Group is physically unmotivated for planets with rocky cores, and observationally problematic due to the sin i ambiguity." The NASA Exoplanet Archive includes objects with a mass (or minimum mass) equal to or less than 30 Jupiter masses.

Sub-brown dwarf

Objects below , called sub-brown dwarf or planetary-mass brown dwarf, form in the same manner as stars and brown dwarfs (i.e. through the collapse of a gas cloud) but have a mass below the limiting mass for thermonuclear fusion of deuterium.

Some researchers call them free-floating planets, whereas others call them planetary-mass brown dwarfs.

Role of other physical properties in the mass estimate 
While spectroscopic features can help to distinguish between low mass stars and brown dwarfs, it is often necessary to estimate the mass to come to a conclusion. The theory behind the mass estimate is that brown dwarfs with a similar mass form in a similar way and are hot when they form. Some have spectral types that are similar to low-mass stars, such as 2M1101AB. As they cool down the brown dwarfs should retain a range of luminosities depending on the mass. Without the age and luminosity a mass estimate is difficult; for example, an L-type brown dwarf could be an old brown dwarf with a high mass (possibly a low-mass star) or a young brown dwarf with a very low mass. For Y dwarfs this is less of a problem as they remain low-mass objects near the sub-brown dwarf limit, even for relative high age estimates. For L and T dwarfs it is still useful to have an accurate age estimate. The luminosity is here the less concerning property, as this can be estimated from the spectral energy distribution. The age estimate can be done in two ways. Either the brown dwarf is young and still has spectral features that are associated with youth or the brown dwarf co-moves with a star or stellar group (star cluster or association), which have easier to obtain age estimates. A very young brown dwarf that was further studied with this method is 2M1207 and the companion 2M1207b. Based on the location, proper motion and spectral signature, this object was determined to belong to the ~8 million year old TW Hydrae association and the mass of the secondary was determined to be below the deuterium burning limit with 8 ± 2 . A very old example of an age estimate that makes use of co-movement is the brown dwarf + white dwarf binary COCONUTS-1, with the white dwarf having a total age of  billion years. In this case the mass was not estimated with the derived age, but the co-movement provided an accurate distance estimate, using Gaia parallax.

Observations

Classification of brown dwarfs

Spectral class M

These are brown dwarfs with a spectral class of M5.5 or later; they are also called late-M dwarfs. These can be considered red dwarfs in the eyes of some scientists. Many brown dwarfs with spectral type M are young objects, such as Teide 1.

Spectral class L

The defining characteristic of spectral class M, the coolest type in the long-standing classical stellar sequence, is an optical spectrum dominated by absorption bands of titanium(II) oxide (TiO) and vanadium(II) oxide (VO) molecules. However, GD 165B, the cool companion to the white dwarf GD 165, had none of the hallmark TiO features of M dwarfs. The subsequent identification of many objects like GD 165B ultimately led to the definition of a new spectral class, the L dwarfs, defined in the red optical region of the spectrum not by metal-oxide absorption bands (TiO, VO), but by metal hydride emission bands (FeH, CrH, MgH, CaH) and prominent atomic lines of alkali metals (Na, K, Rb, Cs). , over 900 L dwarfs have been identified, most by wide-field surveys: the Two Micron All Sky Survey (2MASS), the Deep Near Infrared Survey of the Southern Sky (DENIS), and the Sloan Digital Sky Survey (SDSS). This spectral class contains not only the brown dwarfs, because the coolest main-sequence stars above brown dwarfs (> 80 MJ) have the spectral class L2 to L6.

Spectral class T

As GD 165B is the prototype of the L dwarfs, Gliese 229B is the prototype of a second new spectral class, the T dwarfs. T dwarfs are pinkish-magenta. Whereas near-infrared (NIR) spectra of L dwarfs show strong absorption bands of H2O and carbon monoxide (CO), the NIR spectrum of Gliese 229B is dominated by absorption bands from methane (CH4), features that were found only in the giant planets of the Solar System and Titan. CH4, H2O, and molecular hydrogen (H2) collision-induced absorption (CIA) give Gliese 229B blue near-infrared colors. Its steeply sloped red optical spectrum also lacks the FeH and CrH bands that characterize L dwarfs and instead is influenced by exceptionally broad absorption features from the alkali metals Na and K. These differences led J. Davy Kirkpatrick to propose the T spectral class for objects exhibiting H- and K-band CH4 absorption. , 355 T dwarfs are known. NIR classification schemes for T dwarfs have recently been developed by Adam Burgasser and Tom Geballe. Theory suggests that L dwarfs are a mixture of very-low-mass stars and sub-stellar objects (brown dwarfs), whereas the T dwarf class is composed entirely of brown dwarfs. Because of the absorption of sodium and potassium in the green part of the spectrum of T dwarfs, the actual appearance of T dwarfs to human visual perception is estimated to be not brown, but magenta. T-class brown dwarfs, such as WISE 0316+4307, have been detected more than 100 light-years from the Sun.

Spectral class Y

Three examples are the brown dwarfs CFBDS J005910.90–011401.3, ULAS J133553.45+113005.2 and ULAS J003402.77−005206.7. The spectra of these objects have absorption peaks around 1.55 micrometres. Delorme et al. have suggested that this feature is due to absorption from ammonia and that this should be taken as indicating the T–Y transition, making these objects of type Y0. However, the feature is difficult to distinguish from absorption by water and methane, and other authors have stated that the assignment of class Y0 is premature.

In April 2010, two newly discovered ultracool sub-brown dwarfs (UGPS 0722-05 and SDWFS 1433+35) were proposed as prototypes for spectral class Y0.

Though of planetary mass, Rodriguez et al. suggest it is unlikely to have formed in the same manner as planets.

Shortly after that, Liu et al. published an account of a "very cold" (c. ) brown dwarf orbiting another very-low-mass brown dwarf and noted that "Given its low luminosity, atypical colors and cold temperature, CFBDS J1458+10B is a promising candidate for the hypothesized Y spectral class."

WISE data has revealed hundreds of new brown dwarfs. Of these, fourteen are classified as cool Ys. One of the Y dwarfs, called WISE 1828+2650, was, as of August 2011, the record holder for the coldest brown dwarf—emitting no visible light at all, this type of object resembles free-floating planets more than stars.

It was also unusual in that its observed parallax meant a distance close to  light-years from the Solar System.

The CatWISE catalog combines NASA's WISE and NEOWISE survey. It expands the number of faint sources and is therefore used to find the faintest brown dwarfs, including Y dwarfs. Seventeen candidate Y dwarfs were discovered by the CatWISE researchers. Initial color with the Spitzer Space Telescope indicated that CW1446 is one of the reddest and coldest Y dwarfs.

In January 2020 the discovery of WISE J0830+2837, initially discovered by citizen scientists of the Backyard Worlds project, was presented at the 235th meeting of the American Astronomical Society.

Role of vertical mixing 

In the hydrogen-dominated atmosphere of brown dwarfs a chemical equilibrium between carbon monoxide and methane exists. Carbon monoxide reacts with hydrogen molecules and forms methane and hydroxy in this reaction. The hydroxy radical might later react with hydrogen and form water molecules. In the other direction of the reaction methane reacts with hydroxy and forms carbon monoxide and hydrogen. The chemical reaction is tilted towards carbon monoxide at higher temperatures (L-dwarfs) and lower pressure. At lower temperatures (T-dwarfs) and higher pressure the reaction is tilted towards methane and methane predominates at the T/Y-boundary. Vertical mixing of the atmosphere can however cause methane to sink into lower layers of the atmosphere and carbon monoxide to rise from these lower and hotter layers. The carbon monoxide is slow to react back into methane because of an energy barrier that prevents the break down of the C-O bonds. This forces the observable atmosphere of a brown dwarf to be in a chemical disequilibrium. The L/T transition is mainly defined with the transition from a carbon monoxide dominated atmosphere in L-dwarfs to a methane dominated atmosphere in T-dwarfs. The amount of vertical mixing can therefore push the L/T-transition to lower or higher temperatures. This becomes important for objects with modest surface gravity and extended atmospheres, such as giant exoplanets. This pushes the L/T transition to lower temperatures for giant exoplanets. For brown dwarfs this transition occurs at around 1200 K. The exoplanet HR 8799c on the other hand does not show any methane, while having a temperature of 1100K.

The transition between T/Y-dwarfs is often defined at around 500 K due to missing spectral observations of these cold and faint objects. Future observations with JWST and the ELTs might improve the sample of Y-dwarfs with observed spectra. Y-dwarfs are dominated by deep spectral features of methane, water vapor and possibly absorption features of ammonia and water ice. Vertical mixing, clouds, metallicity, photochemistry, lightning, impact shocks and metallic catalysts might influence the temperature at which the L/T and T/Y transition occurs.

Secondary features 

Young brown dwarfs have low surface gravities because they have larger radii and lower masses compared to the field stars of similar spectral type. These sources are marked by a letter beta (β) for intermediate surface gravity and gamma (γ) for low surface gravity. Indication for low surface gravity are weak CaH, K I and Na I lines, as well as strong VO line. Alpha (α) stands for normal surface gravity and is usually dropped. Sometimes an extremely low surface gravity is denoted by a delta (δ). The suffix "pec" stands for peculiar. The peculiar suffix is still used for other features that are unusual and summarizes different properties, indicative of low surface gravity, subdwarfs and unresolved binaries. The prefix sd stands for subdwarf and only includes cool subdwarfs. This prefix indicates a low metallicity and kinematic properties that are more similar to halo stars than to disk stars. Subdwarfs appear bluer than disk objects. The red suffix describes objects with red color, but an older age. This is not interpreted as low surface gravity, but as a high dust content. The blue suffix describes objects with blue near-infrared colors that cannot be explained with low metallicity. Some are explained as L+T binaries, others are not binaries, such as 2MASS J11263991−5003550 and are explained with thin and/or large-grained clouds.

Spectral and atmospheric properties of brown dwarfs

The majority of flux emitted by L and T dwarfs is in the 1- to 2.5-micrometre near-infrared range. Low and decreasing temperatures through the late-M, -L, and -T dwarf sequence result in a rich near-infrared spectrum containing a wide variety of features, from relatively narrow lines of neutral atomic species to broad molecular bands, all of which have different dependencies on temperature, gravity, and metallicity. Furthermore, these low temperature conditions favor condensation out of the gas state and the formation of grains.

Compared to stars, which warm themselves with steady internal fusion, brown dwarfs cool quickly over time; more massive dwarfs cool more slowly than less massive ones. There is some evidence that the cooling of brown dwarfs slows down at the transition between spectral classes L and T (about 1000 K).

Observations of known brown dwarf candidates have revealed a pattern of brightening and dimming of infrared emissions that suggests relatively cool, opaque cloud patterns obscuring a hot interior that is stirred by extreme winds. The weather on such bodies is thought to be extremely strong, comparable to but far exceeding Jupiter's famous storms.

On January 8, 2013, astronomers using NASA's Hubble and Spitzer space telescopes probed the stormy atmosphere of a brown dwarf named 2MASS J22282889–4310262, creating the most detailed "weather map" of a brown dwarf thus far. It shows wind-driven, planet-sized clouds. The new research is a stepping stone toward a better understanding not only brown dwarfs, but also of the atmospheres of planets beyond the Solar System.

In April 2020 scientists reported clocking wind speeds of +650 ± 310 metres per second (up to 1,450 miles per hour) on the nearby brown dwarf 2MASS J10475385+2124234. To calculate the measurements, scientists compared the rotational movement of atmospheric features, as ascertained by brightness changes, against the electromagnetic rotation generated by the brown dwarf's interior. The results confirmed previous predictions that brown dwarfs would have high winds. Scientists are hopeful that this comparison method can be used to explore the atmospheric dynamics of other brown dwarfs and extrasolar planets.

Observational techniques

Coronagraphs have recently been used to detect faint objects orbiting bright visible stars, including Gliese 229B.

Sensitive telescopes equipped with charge-coupled devices (CCDs) have been used to search distant star clusters for faint objects, including Teide 1.

Wide-field searches have identified individual faint objects, such as Kelu-1 (30 light-years away).

Brown dwarfs are often discovered in surveys to discover exoplanets. Methods of detecting exoplanets work for brown dwarfs as well, although brown dwarfs are much easier to detect.

Brown dwarfs can be powerful emitters of radio emission due to their strong magnetic fields. Observing programs at the Arecibo Observatory and the Very Large Array have detected over a dozen such objects, which are also called ultracool dwarfs because they share common magnetic properties with other objects in this class. The detection of radio emission from brown dwarfs permits their magnetic field strengths to be measured directly.

Milestones
 1995: First brown dwarf verified. Teide 1, an M8 object in the Pleiades cluster, is picked out with a CCD in the Spanish Observatory of Roque de los Muchachos of the Instituto de Astrofísica de Canarias.
 First methane brown dwarf verified. Gliese 229B is discovered orbiting red dwarf Gliese 229A (20 ly away) using an adaptive optics coronagraph to sharpen images from the  reflecting telescope at Palomar Observatory on Southern California's Mt. Palomar; follow-up infrared spectroscopy made with their  Hale telescope shows an abundance of methane.
 1998: First X-ray-emitting brown dwarf found. Cha Halpha 1, an M8 object in the Chamaeleon I dark cloud, is determined to be an X-ray source, similar to convective late-type stars.
 15 December 1999: First X-ray flare detected from a brown dwarf. A team at the University of California monitoring LP 944-20 (16 ly away) via the Chandra X-ray Observatory, catches a 2-hour flare.
 27 July 2000: First radio emission (in flare and quiescence) detected from a brown dwarf. A team of students at the Very Large Array detected emission from LP 944-20.
30 April 2004: First detection of a candidate exoplanet around a brown dwarf: 2M1207b discovered with the VLT and the first directly imaged exoplanet.
20 March 2013: Discovery of the closest brown dwarf system: Luhman 16.
 25 April 2014: Coldest-known brown dwarf discovered. WISE 0855−0714 is 7.2 light-years away (seventh-closest system to the Sun) and has a temperature between −48 to −13 °C.

Brown dwarf as an X-ray source

X-ray flares detected from brown dwarfs since 1999 suggest changing magnetic fields within them, similar to those in very-low-mass stars.

With no strong central nuclear energy source, the interior of a brown dwarf is in a rapid boiling, or convective state. When combined with the rapid rotation that most brown dwarfs exhibit, convection sets up conditions for the development of a strong, tangled magnetic field near the surface. The flare observed by Chandra from LP 944-20 could have its origin in the turbulent magnetized hot material beneath the brown dwarf's surface. A sub-surface flare could conduct heat to the atmosphere, allowing electric currents to flow and produce an X-ray flare, like a stroke of lightning. The absence of X-rays from LP 944-20 during the non-flaring period is also a significant result. It sets the lowest observational limit on steady X-ray power produced by a brown dwarf, and shows that coronas cease to exist as the surface temperature of a brown dwarf cools below about 2,800 K and becomes electrically neutral.

Using NASA's Chandra X-ray Observatory, scientists have detected X-rays from a low-mass brown dwarf in a multiple star system. This is the first time that a brown dwarf this close to its parent star(s) (Sun-like stars TWA 5A) has been resolved in X-rays. "Our Chandra data show that the X-rays originate from the brown dwarf's coronal plasma which is some 3 million degrees Celsius", said Yohko Tsuboi of Chuo University in Tokyo. "This brown dwarf is as bright as the Sun today in X-ray light, while it is fifty times less massive than the Sun", said Tsuboi. "This observation, thus, raises the possibility that even massive planets might emit X-rays by themselves during their youth!"

Brown dwarfs as radio sources
The first brown dwarf that was discovered to emit radio signals was LP 944-20, which was observed based on its X-ray emission. Approximately 5–10% of brown dwarfs appear to have strong magnetic fields and emit radio waves, and there may be as many as 40 magnetic brown dwarfs within 25 pc of the Sun based on Monte Carlo modeling and their average spatial density. The power of the radio emissions of brown dwarfs is roughly constant despite variations in their temperatures. Brown dwarfs may maintain magnetic fields of up to 6 kG in strength. Astronomers have estimated brown dwarf magnetospheres to span an altitude of approximately 107 m given properties of their radio emissions. It is unknown whether the radio emissions from brown dwarfs more closely resemble those from planets or stars. Some brown dwarfs emit regular radio pulses, which are sometimes interpreted as radio emission beamed from the poles, but may also be beamed from active regions. The regular, periodic reversal of radio wave orientation may indicate that brown dwarf magnetic fields periodically reverse polarity. These reversals may be the result of a brown dwarf magnetic activity cycle, similar to the solar cycle.

Binary brown dwarfs 

Observations of the orbit of binary systems containing brown dwarfs can be used to measure the mass of the brown dwarf. In the case of 2MASSW J0746425+2000321, the secondary weighs 6% of the solar mass. This measurement is called a dynamical mass. The brown dwarf system closest to the Solar System is the binary Luhman 16. It was attempted to search for planets around this system with a similar method, but none were found.

The discovery of the system gave definitive insights to the formation of brown dwarfs. It was previously thought that wide binary brown dwarfs are not formed or at least are disrupted at ages of 1–10 Myr. The existence of this system is also inconsistent with the ejection hypothesis. The ejection hypothesis was a proposed hypothesis in which brown dwarfs form in a multiple system, but are ejected before they gain enough mass to burn hydrogen.

More recently the wide binary W2150AB was discovered. It has a similar mass ratio and binding energy as 2M1101AB, but a greater age and is located in a different region of the galaxy. While 2M1101AB is in a closely crowded region, the binary W2150AB is in a sparsely-separated field. It must have survived any dynamical interactions in its natal star cluster. The binary belongs also to a few L+T binaries that can be easily resolved by ground-based observatories. The other two are SDSS J1416+13AB and Luhman 16.

There are other interesting binary systems such as the eclipsing binary brown dwarf system 2MASS J05352184–0546085. Photometric studies of this system have revealed that the less massive brown dwarf in the system is hotter than its higher-mass companion.

Brown dwarfs around white dwarfs are quite rare. GD 165B, the prototype of the L dwarfs, is one such system. Systems with close, tidally locked brown dwarfs orbiting around white dwarfs belong to the post common envelope binaries or PCEBs. Only 8 confirmed PCEBs containing a white dwarf with a brown dwarf companion are known, including WD 0137-349 AB. In the past history of these close white dwarf-brown dwarf binaries, the brown dwarf is engulfed by the star in the red giant phase. Brown dwarfs with a mass lower than 20 Jupiter masses would evaporate during the engulfment. The dearth of brown dwarfs orbiting close to white dwarfs can be compared with similar observations of brown dwarfs around main-sequence stars, described as the brown-dwarf desert. The PCEB might evolve into a cataclysmic variable star (CV*) with the brown dwarf as the donor and in the last stage of the system the binary might merge. The nova CK Vulpeculae might be a result of such a white dwarf–brown dwarf merger.

Recent developments 

Estimates of brown dwarf populations in the solar neighbourhood suggest that there may be as many as six stars for every brown dwarf. A more recent estimate from 2017 using the young massive star cluster RCW 38 concluded that the Milky Way galaxy contains between 25 and 100 billion brown dwarfs. (Compare these numbers to the estimates of the number of stars in the Milky Way; 100 to 400 billion.)

In a study published in Aug 2017 NASA's Spitzer Space Telescope monitored infrared brightness variations in brown dwarfs caused by cloud cover of variable thickness. The observations revealed large-scale waves propagating in the atmospheres of brown dwarfs (similarly to the atmosphere of Neptune and other Solar System giant planets). These atmospheric waves modulate the thickness of the clouds and propagate with different velocities (probably due to differential rotation).

In August 2020, astronomers discovered 95 brown dwarfs near the Sun through the project Backyard Worlds: Planet 9.

Formation and evolution 
Brown dwarfs form similarly to stars and are surrounded by protoplanetary disks, such as Cha 110913−773444. As of 2017 there is only one known proto-brown dwarf that is connected with a large Herbig–Haro object. This is the brown dwarf Mayrit 1701117, which is surrounded by a pseudo-disk and a Keplerian disk. Mayrit 1701117 launches the 0.7-light-year-long jet H 1165, mostly seen in ionized sulfur.

Disks around brown dwarfs have been found to have many of the same features as disks around stars; therefore, it is expected that there will be accretion-formed planets around brown dwarfs. Given the small mass of brown dwarf disks, most planets will be terrestrial planets rather than gas giants. If a giant planet orbits a brown dwarf across our line of sight, then, because they have approximately the same diameter, this would give a large signal for detection by transit. The accretion zone for planets around a brown dwarf is very close to the brown dwarf itself, so tidal forces would have a strong effect.

The brown dwarf Cha 110913−773444, located 500 light-years away in the constellation Chamaeleon, may be in the process of forming a miniature planetary system. Astronomers from Pennsylvania State University have detected what they believe to be a disk of gas and dust similar to the one hypothesized to have formed the Solar System. Cha 110913−773444 is the smallest brown dwarf found to date, and if it formed a planetary system, it would be the smallest-known object to have one.

Planets around brown dwarfs

The super-Jupiter planetary-mass objects 2M1207b, 2MASS J044144 and Oph 98 B that are orbiting brown dwarfs at large orbital distances may have formed by cloud collapse rather than accretion and so may be sub-brown dwarfs rather than planets, which is inferred from relatively large masses and large orbits. The first discovery of a low-mass companion orbiting a brown dwarf (ChaHα8) at a small orbital distance using the radial velocity technique paved the way for the detection of planets around brown dwarfs on orbits of a few AU or smaller. However, with a mass ratio between the companion and primary in ChaHα8 of about 0.3, this system rather resembles a binary star. Then, in 2008, the first planetary-mass companion in a relatively small orbit (MOA-2007-BLG-192Lb) was discovered orbiting a brown dwarf.

Planets around brown dwarfs are likely to be carbon planets depleted of water.

A 2017 study, based upon observations with Spitzer estimates that 175 brown dwarfs need to be monitored in order to guarantee (95%) at least one detection of a planet.

Habitability 

Habitability for hypothetical planets orbiting brown dwarfs has been studied. Computer models suggesting conditions for these bodies to have habitable planets are very stringent, the habitable zone being narrow, close (T dwarf 0.005 AU) and decreasing with time, due to the cooling of the brown dwarf (they fuse for at most 10 million years).    The orbits there would have to be of extremely low eccentricity (on the order of 10 to the minus 6) to avoid strong tidal forces that would trigger a runaway greenhouse effect on the planets, rendering them uninhabitable. There would also be no moons.

Superlative brown dwarfs

In 1984, it was postulated by some astronomers that the Sun may be orbited by an undetected brown dwarf (sometimes referred to as Nemesis) that could interact with the Oort cloud just as passing stars can. However, this hypothesis has fallen out of favor.

Table of firsts

Table of extremes

Gallery

See also
 Fusor (astronomy)
 
 
 
 
 Stellification

References

External links

HubbleSite newscenter – Weather patterns on a brown dwarf

History
 Kumar, Shiv S.; Low-Luminosity Stars. Gordon and Breach, London, 1969—an early overview paper on brown dwarfs
 The Columbia Encyclopedia: "Brown Dwarfs"

Details
 A current list of L and T dwarfs
 A geological definition of brown dwarfs, contrasted with stars and planets (via Berkeley)
 I. Neill Reid's pages at the Space Telescope Science Institute:
 On spectral analysis of M dwarfs, L dwarfs, and T dwarfs
 Temperature and mass characteristics of low-temperature dwarfs
 First X-ray from brown dwarf observed, Spaceref.com, 2000
 Montes, David; "Brown Dwarfs and ultracool dwarfs (late-M, L, T)", UCM
 Wild Weather: Iron Rain on Failed Stars—scientists are investigating astonishing weather patterns on brown dwarfs, Space.com, 2006
 NASA Brown dwarf detectives—Detailed information in a simplified sense
 Brown Dwarfs—Website with general information about brown dwarfs (has many detailed and colorful artist's impressions)

Stars
 Cha Halpha 1 stats and history
 "A census of observed brown dwarfs" (not all confirmed), 1998
 
 Michaud, Peter; Heyer, Inge; Leggett, Sandy K.; and Adamson, Andy; "Discovery Narrows the Gap Between Planets and Brown Dwarfs", Gemini and Joint Astronomy Centre, 2007
 Deacon, Niall R.; and Hambly, Nigel C.; "Y-Spectral class for Ultra-Cool Dwarfs", 2006

 
Definition of planet
Star types
Stellar phenomena
Substellar objects
Types of planet